Le Beau Serge (literal English translation: "Handsome Serge") is a 1958 French film directed by Claude Chabrol. It has been cited as the first product of the Nouvelle Vague, or French New Wave, film movement. The film is often compared with Chabrol's subsequent film Les Cousins, which also stars Gérard Blain and Jean-Claude Brialy.

Plot
François, a young man recovering from a mild case of a respiratory illness (probably tuberculosis), returns to his home town of Sardent after a long absence to spend the winter there. He is surprised to find that his old friend Serge has, dissatisfied with life in the village, become a wretched alcoholic. Serge had hoped to leave the village to study, but had to stay to marry a local girl, Yvonne, when she became pregnant. Their first child was stillborn, but Yvonne is pregnant again.

Though François feels somewhat out of place in the provincial village, he is driven by his desire to figure out a way to help Serge. While he works on this, he strikes up a relationship with Yvonne's promiscuous 17-year-old sister, Marie, with whom Serge also has a sexual history. Marie lives with Glomaud, a drunk who is rumored to not really be her biological father, though no one knows if he is aware of this. After Glomaud confronts François about sleeping with Marie and gets François to say that Marie is not his daughter, François visits Marie and discovers that Glomaud has just raped her.

Serge and François alternately reminisce about the past and argue about the present and future. Things between them come to a head at a town dance when Serge beats up François for trying to stop him from cheating on Yvonne with Marie. François withdraws to his room for a time, unsure of what to do next.

When François hears that Yvonne has gone into labor and neither the doctor nor Serge can be found, he jumps into action. First, he tracks down the doctor, who is attending to a sick Glomaud. The doctor does not want to leave, as he thinks the baby will probably be another stillbirth, while he can help Glomaud, but Glomaud tells him to go, since he has Marie to care for him. Going out again into the cold and dark, François finds Serge sleeping outside. Serge is very drunk, so François has to drag him home through the snow, but they make it in time for the birth of a healthy, though premature, baby boy. François collapses in exhaustion and Serge beams, crying and laughing almost hysterically.

Cast
Gérard Blain as Serge
Jean-Claude Brialy as François Bayon
Michèle Méritz as Yvonne
Bernadette Lafont as Marie
Claude Cerval as the priest
Jeanne Pérez as Madame Chaunier
Edmond Beauchamp as Glomaud
André Dino as the doctor
Michel Creuze as Michel, the baker
Claude Chabrol as La Truffe
Philippe de Broca as Jacques Rivette de la Chasuble

Production
At one point, Chabrol had intended for Les Cousins, rather than Le Beau Serge, to be his first film project, but, due to that film's Paris setting, it would have been twice as expensive to film. Le Beau Serge was filmed in Sardent, where Chabrol, whose mother was from the village, often spent childhood summers with his grandmother and lived during the war years. It was shot over a period of nine weeks in the winter of 1957-8 on a budget of 32 million old French francs, which Chabrol acquired courtesy of an inheritance his first wife had received. The film was initially 2 hours and 35 minutes long. To reduce the running time, Chabrol cut a great deal of quasi-documentary material, a decision he later regretted.

References

External links
 
Le beau Serge: Homecomings an essay by Terrence Rafferty at the Criterion Collection

French drama films
1958 films
Films directed by Claude Chabrol
Films about alcoholism
1958 directorial debut films